Leeuwenia is a genus of thrips in the family Phlaeothripidae.

Species
 Leeuwenia aculeatrix
 Leeuwenia ananthakrishnani
 Leeuwenia angulata
 Leeuwenia arbastoae
 Leeuwenia ardisiae
 Leeuwenia caelatrix
 Leeuwenia convergens
 Leeuwenia coriacea
 Leeuwenia crocodilus
 Leeuwenia diospyri
 Leeuwenia eugeniae
 Leeuwenia fimbriatrix
 Leeuwenia flavicornata
 Leeuwenia gladiatrix
 Leeuwenia indica
 Leeuwenia karnyi
 Leeuwenia karnyiana
 Leeuwenia maculans
 Leeuwenia pasanii
 Leeuwenia polyosmae
 Leeuwenia pugnatrix
 Leeuwenia scolopiae
 Leeuwenia seriatrix
 Leeuwenia spinosus
 Leeuwenia taiwanensis
 Leeuwenia tetrastigmae
 Leeuwenia vorax

References

Phlaeothripidae
Thrips
Thrips genera